Mount Maglione is a low mountain  northeast of Mount Ekblaw in the Clark Mountains of Marie Byrd Land, Antarctica. It was mapped by the United States Geological Survey from surveys and U.S. Navy air photos, 1959–65, and was named by the Advisory Committee on Antarctic Names for Lieutenant Charles R. Maglione, U.S. Navy Reserve, a navigator on LC-130F Hercules aircraft during Operation Deep Freeze 1968.

References

Mountains of Marie Byrd Land